This is a list of countries by apricot production in 2016 and 2017, based on data from the Food and Agriculture Organization Corporate Statistical Database. The estimated total world production for apricots in 2017 was 4,257,241 metric tonnes, up 9.7% from 3,766,079 tonnes in 2016.

Production by country

>100,000 tonnes

50,000–100,000 tonnes

10,000–50,000 tonnes

1,000–10,000 tonnes

<1,000 tonnes

Notes

References 

Lists of countries by production
Apricot
Apricots
Apricots